Marvin Rood Dye (July 12, 1895 – October 25, 1997) was an American lawyer and politician.

Dye was the born of Daniel A. Dye and Jenni (Marvin) Dye in Forestville, Chautauqua County, New York. He graduated LL.B. from Cornell Law School in 1917. During World War I, he joined the armed forces and was commissioned a first lieutenant. On June 25, 1918, he married Miriam Kelley. Returning to civilian life, he began practicing law at Rochester, New York in 1920. He was County Attorney of Monroe County from 1934 to 1935.

On November 11, 1940, Dye was appointed by Governor Herbert H. Lehman to the New York Court of Claims.

In 1944, Dye was elected on the Democratic, American Labor and Liberal tickets to the New York Court of Appeals, and was re-elected unopposed in 1958. He retired from the Court of Appeals at the end of 1965 when he reached the constitutional age limit of 70 years, but later served on the New York Supreme Court (7th District).

Sources
The History of the New York Court of Appeals, 1932-2003 by Bernard S. Meyer, Burton C. Agata & Seth H. Agata (page 20)
 Court of Appeals judges
Political Graveyard [gives wrong middle name "Reed"]

Judges of the New York Court of Appeals
1895 births
1997 deaths
American centenarians
Men centenarians
Cornell Law School alumni
People from Forestville, New York
Politicians from Rochester, New York
New York Supreme Court Justices
20th-century American judges
Lawyers from Rochester, New York
20th-century American lawyers